Shilabo (also spelled "Scilave", "Shelabo") is a town in eastern Ethiopia, in the Korahe Zone of the Somali Region. It is the administrative center of Shilavo woreda.

History

Somali military units supported the Western Somali Liberation Front's attack on an Ethiopian military unit outside Silavo in June 1982, which led to a renewal of hostilities between the two countries. 

The former President of nearby Somalia, Maj. General Mohamed Siyad Barre, was born in Shilavo, although he later claimed he was born in Garbahaarreey so he would be eligible to serve in the Italian colonial police force.

The mayor of Shilabo, Hassan Ali Omar, was arrested in July 1995, for allegedly being a member of the Ogaden National Liberation Front.

Demographics 
Based on 2005 figures from the Central Statistical Agency, Shilavo has an estimated total population of 7,239 of whom 3,877 are men and 3,362 are women. The 1997 census reported this town had a total population of 4,853 of whom 2,561 were men and 2,383 women. The largest ethnic group reported in this town was the Somali (98.95%)1994 Population and Housing Census of Ethiopia: Results for Somali Region, Vol. 1 Tables 2.4, 2.13 (accessed 10 January 2009). The results of the 1994 census in the Somali Region were not satisfactory, so the census was repeated in 1997. 

The city is primarily inhabited by the Awrtable subclan of Daarod, Marehan sub clan of Daarod, the Ogaden subclan of Daarod and a small community of the Hawadle subclan of Hawiye.

Notes 

Populated places in the Somali Region